2009 in professional wrestling describes the year's events in the world of professional wrestling.

List of notable promotions 
These promotions held notable shows in 2009.

Calendar of notable shows

January

February

March

April

May

June

July

August

September

October

November

December

Accomplishments and tournaments

AAA

AAA Hall of Fame

TNA

WWE

WWE Hall of Fame

Slammy Awards

Awards and honors

Pro Wrestling Illustrated

Wrestling Observer Newsletter

Wrestling Observer Newsletter Hall of Fame

Wrestling Observer Newsletter awards

Title changes

AAA

NJPW

ROH

TNA

WWE 
 – Raw
 – SmackDown
 - ECW

Raw and SmackDown each had a world championship, a secondary championship, a women's championship, and a male tag team championship until their respective tag team titles became shared across all the brands. ECW only had a world championship.

Debuts
 Unknown month – Tony Deppen
 April – Bray Wyatt
 July 17 - Cedric Alexander
 July 18 - Powerhouse Hobbs
 August 1 - Trey Miguel
 August 15 – Big Cass
 August 17 – Apollo Crews/Uhaa Nation
 August 22 – Mia Yim
 August 23 – Soma Takao
 September – Aksana
 September 3 – Naomi
 September 21 – Takumi Tsukamoto
 September 26 
 Robert Dreissker
 Tamina Snuka
 November 23 – Akito
 November 27 – Alexander James
 December 6 – Alex Windsor
 December 12 - Flamita
 December 17 – Big E

Retirements
 Lena Yada (January 4, 2008 – 2009)
 One Man Gang (1977-2009) 
 Mike Shaw (1980-2009) 
 Doug Basham (1993–2009)
 John Layfield (1992 – April 6, 2009) (moved to color commentator, later returned to compete at Royal Rumble 2014)
 David Flair (1999-May 15, 2009) 
 Candice Michelle (November 15, 2004 – June 19, 2009) (although she had been fully inactive from in-ring competition since 2009, she announced her full retirement in December 2017)
 Sharmell (1998 – October 18, 2009)
 Jamie Noble (1995 – November 10, 2009) (semi-retired)
 Jon Heidenreich (2001 – November 28, 2009)
 Christy Hemme (July 15, 2004 – December 16, 2009) (moved to ring announcer)
 Azumi Hyuga (December 4, 1994 – December 27, 2009)

Deaths 

 January 13 – Cousin Junior, 48
 January 16 – Paul E. Normous, 33
 February 2 - Jim Wilson (wrestler), 66
 March 2 - Robert Bruce (wrestler), 65
 March 4 – Yvon Cormier, 70
 March 13 – Test, 33
 March 22  
 Steve Doll, 48
 Abismo Negro, 37
 April 28 – Buddy Rose, 56
 May 8 – Cynthia Peretti, 60
 May 28 - John Tolos, 78
 June 13 – Mitsuharu Misawa, 46
 June 22 – Billy Red Lyons, 77
 July 5 - Waldo Von Erich, 75
 July 22 - Damian Steele, 33/34 
 August 5 – Al Tomko, 77
 August 12 - Karl Von Hess, 90
 August 27 - Shota Chochishvili, 59
 September 6 - Butcher Brannigan, 61 
 September 10 - Kerry Brown (wrestler), 51
 October 14 – Lou Albano, 76
 October 18 - Ryuma Go, 53
 November 12 - Orig Williams, 78  
 November 25 – Adam Firestorm, 32
 December 4 – Umaga, 36
 December 29 - Dr. Death Steve Williams, 49

See also
List of NJPW pay-per-view events
List of ROH pay-per-view events
List of TNA pay-per-view events
List of WWE pay-per-view events

References

 
professional wrestling